Metropolitan University could refer to one of several educational institutions:

 Budapest Metropolitan University, Hungary
 Cardiff Metropolitan University, United Kingdom, formerly University of Wales Institute, Cardiff
 Everest University, Florida, USA, formerly the Florida Metropolitan University
 Hong Kong Metropolitan University, Hong Kong, formerly The Open University of Hong Kong
 Kuala Lumpur Metropolitan University College, Kuala Lumpur, Malaysia.
 Leeds Beckett University, formerly Leeds Metropolitan University and Leeds Polytechnic
 London Metropolitan University, formerly London Guildhall University and the University of North London
 Manchester Metropolitan University, United Kingdom
 Metropolitan State University, Minnesota, United States
 Metropolitan University, Belgrade, Serbia
 Metropolitan University College, Denmark
 Metropolitan University Prague, Czech Republic
 Metropolitan University of Educational Sciences, Santiago, Chile
 Metropolitan University of Technology, Chile
 Metropolitan University, Sylhet, Bangladesh
 Metropolitan University (Puerto Rico) (UMET)
 Nelson Mandela Metropolitan University, Port Elizabeth, South Africa
 Osaka Metropolitan University, Japan
 Oslo Metropolitan University, Norway
 Swansea Metropolitan University, now part of the University of Wales Trinity Saint David
 Tokyo Metropolitan University, Japan
 Toronto Metropolitan University, Canada, formerly Ryerson University
 Universidad Autónoma Metropolitana (Metropolitan Autonomous University), Mexico City, Mexico
 Universidad Metropolitana, Caracas, Venezuela

See also 
 Coalition of Urban and Metropolitan Universities, an organisation of US universities
 City University (disambiguation)